Arvizu is a surname. Notable people with the surname include:

Alexander Arvizu, United States diplomat
Jorge Arvizu (1932–2014), Mexican voice actor
Manuel Arvizu (1919–2009), Mexican Bishop
Michelle Arvizu, television and film actress
Reginald Arvizu (born 1969), bassist of the band Korn